Rudy Albert Davalos, Jr. is an American retired basketball coach and college athletics administrator.

He is the father of former Texas State head basketball coach Doug Davalos.

References

Year of birth missing (living people)
Place of birth missing (living people)
Living people
Auburn Tigers men's basketball coaches
Houston Cougars athletic directors
Kentucky Wildcats men's basketball coaches
New Mexico Lobos athletic directors
San Antonio Spurs assistant coaches
Sewanee Tigers men's basketball coaches
Texas State Bobcats men's basketball players
UTSA Roadrunners athletic directors